Asaro may refer to:

Papua New Guinea
Asaro'o language, a Finisterre language in Madang Province
Asaro River, Eastern Highlands province
Asaro Mudmen, a costume tradition involving mud masks in Goroka, Eastern Highlands province
Dano language (Upper Asaro)
Lower Asaro Rural LLG
Upper Asaro Rural LLG

People
Catherine Asaro (born 1955), science fiction/fantasy author and physicist
Frank Asaro (1927–2014), nuclear chemist

See also
4531 Asaro, a minor planet

Surnames of Italian origin